Moshe Ze'ev Feldman (14 November 1930 – 9 February 1997) was an Israeli rabbi and politician who served as a member of the Knesset for Agudat Yisrael between 1988 and 1992. He also served as Deputy Minister of Labor and Social Welfare from 1988 until 1989.

Biography
Born in Eisenstadt, Austria in 1930, Feldman's family moved to England in 1936. He was educated at a high school for gifted children, before attending the HaRav Weingorten's yeshiva in Staines and the Shfat Emet yeshiva. He emigrated to Israel in 1949, and was certified as a rabbi. He became headmaster of the Omar Emet yeshiva in Bnei Brak, and also headed the Beit Yisrael yeshiva in Ashdod, the Aguda yeshiva in Kfar Saba and the Karlin yeshiva in Bnei Brak.

He joined the Agudat Yisrael movement, becoming a member of its central committee, World Executive Committee and eventually chairman of the party in Israel. He was elected to the Knesset on its list in 1988, and was appointed Deputy Minister of Labor and Social Welfare in Yitzhak Shamir's government, although he resigned on 31 October 1989. He lost his seat in the 1992 elections.

He died in 1997 at the age of 66.

References

External links
 

1930 births
1997 deaths
Israeli rabbis
Israeli educators
People from Eisenstadt
Austrian Jews
Austrian emigrants to the United Kingdom
English Jews
British emigrants to Israel
Israeli people of Austrian-Jewish descent
Israeli people of Hungarian-Jewish descent
Agudat Yisrael politicians
Members of the 12th Knesset (1988–1992)
Deputy ministers of Israel
English people of Hungarian-Jewish descent
English people of Austrian-Jewish descent
Oberlander Jews
Rabbinic members of the Knesset